The Captain Is Out to Lunch and the Sailors Have Taken Over the Ship is a collection of extracts from the journals of Charles Bukowski, spanning 1991 to 1993. The book was first published in 1998 with illustrations by Robert Crumb. The diary entries record the last few years of Bukowski's life, ages 71 to 72 (having lived only to age 73), in which he talks about drinking, gambling, aging, fighting, fame, and the ordinary, day-to-day activities of a famous, alcoholic, gambling writer.  Of most importance throughout this novel is that Bukowski makes sure his 9 different cats are well-fed and taken-care-of, even when his girlfriend (several decades younger) is too drunk or hungover to help with this activity.

The title is taken from the first sentence of the last diary entry, although it doesn't define any plot but acts as a type of prose.  Given the contexts of the poems about Anarchy and Anarchism in Burning in Water, Drowning in Flame: Selected Poems 1955–1973 (1974), it is likely that Bukowski's work here (especially the title) is inspired by the Anarchist-Communism he discovered when working with anarchist and Jewish editors in New York, USA in the early 60's (see the poem: "I Wanted to Take Down the Government, But All I Took Down was my Best Friend's Wife").

Legacy 
Numerous sayings of Bukowski from this book, particularly about racetrack betting, are enthralled in the movie Factotum.

American autobiographies
1998 books
Books by Charles Bukowski
Diaries
Literary autobiographies
Comics by Robert Crumb